Greg Scarnici (born April 8, 1972) is an American comedic writer, director, producer, performer and drag queen. He was born in Jamaica, Queens, and continues to work in New York City, where he balances work in theatre, film, and television. He is best known for his viral music video parodies, featured on Anderson Cooper 360, Fox News Channel, on VH1's Best Week Ever and in Entertainment Weekly which have been viewed over ten million times on YouTube. His work has also been featured on MTV, VH1, Fox News and CNN.  He currently works as an Associate Producer at Saturday Night Live  and is a contributing writer for The Huffington Post.

Greg has also been featured on the TV shows 30 Rock, Nick Cannon's Short Circuitz, Straight Plan for the Gay Man, and Saturday Night Live, where he has also contributed jokes and promos. Associate Producer TV credits include Saturday Night Live, Macy's Fourth of July Fireworks Spectacular, and the 2014 NBA All-Star Pre-Game Concert.  Film credits include the award-winning indie, Glam-Trash and the short films, Dead End and Children of the Dune.

Books
In 2010, Greg released "Sex in Drag" – a parody of Madonna's infamous "Sex" book, shot entirely on Fire Island.

In 2015, his first collection of comedic essays, "I Hope My Mother Doesn't Read This" was published by Thought Catalog books.

In March 2019, Greg released his second collection of comedic essays, "Dungeons and Drag Queens" about his experiences on Fire Island.

In 2020, Greg released "Hot Rods" - a parody of a vintage gay porn magazine from the 1970s shot entirely on Fire Island.

Music
In 2009, Greg released his debut collection of comedic dance tracks, entitled "12 Inch Freak", which featured the single, "Gimme More (Pills)", a parody of Britney Spears' hit, "Gimme More."

He also produces house music with Joe Thompson, under the name Undercover.  Their self-titled debut album was released in 2012, and their follow-up album, "Night Beats" was released in 2015.

He also produces and releases music under his drag queen alter ego, Levonia, including the single, "So Cunt" which was called The Song of The Summer on Jezebel.com, Slate.com & PaperMag.com.

External links 
 GregScarnici.com
 
 Sexindrag.com

References 

Male actors from New York City
1972 births
Living people
American gay actors
American people of Italian descent